The 2016 Woodstock Winton SuperSprint was a motor racing event for V8 Supercars, held on the weekend of 20 to 22 May 2016. The event was held at Winton Motor Raceway in Winton, Victoria, and consisted of one race of 120 kilometres and one race of 200 km in length. It was the fifth event of fourteen in the 2016 International V8 Supercars Championship and hosted Races 10 and 11 of the season. The event was the 29th running of the Winton SuperSprint.

Tim Slade dominated the event, winning both races and also taking pole position for Race 10. The Race 10 win was Slade's first in the series. Mark Winterbottom finished on the podium in both races, with a third and a second place, to take the championship lead at the end of the event. Scott McLaughlin led the championship after Race 10 where he finished second to Slade, but he could only finish eleventh in Race 11. The Race 11 podium was completed by Fabian Coulthard, who scored his second podium finish of the season. Chaz Mostert had started the race on pole position, but an incident later in the race meant he would only finish 20th.

Report

Background 
The circuit was resurfaced in January 2016, with the profile of Turns 10 and 12 changed in the process. Several teams tested at the circuit in February, with drivers reporting that the new surface made the circuit more challenging. Drivers found that the new surface provided good grip for the tyres, yet was slippery off the racing line, which led to a number of drivers going off the circuit.

Craig Lowndes entered the event as the championship leader, courtesy of a strong weekend at Barbagallo two weeks previously, ahead of his teammate Jamie Whincup.

Practice 
A 30-minute practice session was held on Friday afternoon for additional drivers, consisting mostly of Enduro Cup co-drivers. Steve Owen, driving Chaz Mostert's car, set the fastest time of 1:20.3098 during the session ahead of Jack Le Brocq and Dean Fiore. Only 25 cars took part in the session, with Shane van Gisbergen's co-driver Alexandre Prémat not available for the event.

The first session for championship drivers also took place on Friday afternoon and was one hour in duration. The new track surface led to fast lap times, with Tim Slade setting a new practice lap record of 1:19.2435. Cameron Waters was second fastest ahead of Scott McLaughlin. Non-regular drivers Alex Rullo and Richie Stanaway completed laps during the session, driving the cars of Andre Heimgartner and Chris Pither respectively. Rick Kelly missed the majority of the session due to an issue with the clutch on his car.

A second one-hour session was held later on Friday afternoon and was topped by Van Gisbergen, who set a time of 1:19.3311. Rick Kelly was second fastest ahead of Van Gisbergen's teammates Whincup and Lowndes. Whincup missed 20 minutes of the session while his team fixed a broken suspension component. Dirt was dragged onto the circuit in several places as a result of the higher speeds being achieved by drivers, causing lap times to not be as fast as expected. The problem was resolved overnight, with the track organisers sweeping loose dirt away from the edge of the circuit. The session also saw the trial of a new speed limiter system to be used during safety car periods, which would limit the cars to 100 km/h when catching up to the safety car.

A final practice session was held on Saturday morning and was 15 minutes in length. Mark Winterbottom lowered the practice lap record even further with a time of 1:19.0469. DJR Team Penske teammates Scott Pye and Fabian Coulthard were second and third fastest ahead of McLaughlin and Pither. Nick Percat failed to complete a lap due to an engine problem.

Qualifying – Race 10 
Qualifying for Race 10 was held on Saturday afternoon and consisted of a single 15-minute session. Slade took his first pole position since 2012, and the first for Holden in the 2016 season, with a time of 1:19.0660. Winterbottom was second fastest ahead of his teammate Waters, with McLaughlin and Rick Kelly completing the top five. Lucas Dumbrell Motorsport were unable to replace the engine in Percat's car prior to the session and he did not take to the circuit, leaving him to start from the back of the grid in the race.

Race 10 
Race 10 took place on Saturday afternoon, with regulations requiring each car to make at least one pit stop to change all four tyres after lap 4. Slade maintained first place at the start while McLaughlin moved into second at the first corner. Contact between James Moffat, Garth Tander and Dale Wood damaged a steering arm on Moffat's car, causing him to lose five laps while repairs were carried out. Tander suffered a puncture, forcing him to pit at the end of the first lap. Waters, Van Gisbergen and Lowndes were the first drivers to complete their pit stops, coming in at the end of lap 4. Slade stopped on lap 9, followed by McLaughlin on lap 10 and Winterbottom on lap 12. On lap 17, Waters and James Courtney made contact going into Turn 5, leading to a spin for Waters and both drivers going off the circuit. Both drivers lost a number of positions while they rejoined the circuit.

Slade regained the lead when Coulthard made his pit stop on lap 27, with McLaughlin in second place ahead of Winterbottom and Rick Kelly. Slade went on to win by over four seconds, with McLaughlin struggling for pace. Winterbottom, Rick Kelly, Whincup, Davison and Mostert completed the top seven, all finishing within 3.5 seconds of McLaughlin. Slade said of his victory, which was his first in 227 attempts: "Finally. Man, what a feeling ... Thanks to everyone who has supported me. It’s a pretty crazy feeling." With Lowndes finishing in 15th place, McLaughlin assumed the championship lead ahead of Whincup.

Qualifying – Race 11 
Mostert took his third pole position in qualifying for Race 11, which was a single 20-minute session held on Sunday morning. Coulthard was second fastest ahead of Lowndes, both within one one-hundredth of a second of Mostert's time, while Slade was fourth fastest.

Race 11 
Race 11 was held on Sunday afternoon and the race regulations required each car to take on at least 120 litres of fuel during the race. Coulthard took the lead at the start of the race, ahead of Mostert and Lowndes. Winterbottom, Courtney and Van Gisbergen, all on a three-stop strategy, each made their first pit stop at the end of the first lap. Mostert stopped at the end of lap 2, followed by Lowndes and Rick Kelly on lap 4. Coulthard and Slade, both on a two-stop strategy, made the first of their pit stops on lap 18. The safety car was deployed on lap 19 to allow Lee Holdsworth's car, which had stopped with a gearbox problem, to be recovered. Several drivers on a three-stop strategy, including Lowndes, Winterbottom and Mostert, took the opportunity to complete the second of their pit stops.

Rick Kelly, who had not stopped under the safety car, led at the restart on lap 22 but was passed by Slade. Mostert had stopped twice under the safety car to meet the fuel requirement and did not need to pit again, but he made contact with Courtney at Turn 10. The incident caused a puncture on Mostert's car, while Courtney's had to be taken into the pit garage to be repaired, leaving him multiple laps off the lead. Winterbottom made his third and final pit stop on lap 24. Lowndes did the same on lap 25 and the pair collided at Turn 3 after Lowndes returned to the circuit, forcing him off the track. Slade made his second pit stop on lap 40 and emerged 1.5 seconds ahead of Winterbottom, while Coulthard stopped on lap 43.

McLaughlin and Percat were the last drivers to pit, doing so on lap 45. This left Slade in the lead ahead of Winterbottom, Van Gisbergen, Coulthard and Waters. With fresher tyres, Coulthard passed Van Gisbergen on lap 47 and then closed the gap to Winterbottom. However, he was unable to make a pass in the closing laps. Slade took victory by a margin of 6.7 seconds over Winterbottom and Coulthard, while Van Gisbergen finished fourth ahead of Waters and David Reynolds. Pye went off the circuit on the last lap and dropped to seventh, while Lowndes was eighth with a broken header on his car. McLaughlin finished eleventh, and as a result he lost the championship lead to Winterbottom.

Post-race 
Van Gisbergen was given a 10-point penalty for careless driving after he made contact with Tander following the safety car restart.

Results

Race 10

Qualifying

Race

Race 11

Qualifying

Race

Championship standings after the event 
 After Race 11 of 29. Only the top five positions are included for both sets of standings.

Drivers' Championship standings

Teams' Championship standings

References 

Woodstock Winton SuperSprint
Woodstock Winton SuperSprint